Charles Albert Conerly Jr. (September 19, 1921 – February 13, 1996) was an American professional football player who was a quarterback in the National Football League (NFL) for the New York Giants from 1948 through 1961. Conerly played college football for the Ole Miss Rebels and was inducted into the College Football Hall of Fame in 1966. He was married to Perian Conerly, a sports columnist for The New York Times.

College career

Conerly attended and played college football at the University of Mississippi (Ole Miss). He started at Ole Miss in 1942, but left to serve as a Marine in the South Pacific during World War II where he fought in the Battle of Guam.

He returned to Mississippi in 1946 and led the team to their first Southeastern Conference (SEC) championship in 1947. During that season, he led the nation in pass completions with 133, rushed for nine touchdowns and passed for 18 more, was a consensus All-American selection, and was named Player of the Year by the Helms Athletic Foundation. He played the halfback position for the Rebels. He earned consensus All-America in 1947 when he led the Rebels to a record of 9–2 including a 13–9 win over TCU in the Delta Bowl at Crump Stadium in Memphis, Tennessee.

Conerly's 1947 squad had upset wins over Kentucky (14–7 in Oxford), Florida (14–6 in Jacksonville, Florida), LSU (20–18 in Baton Rouge), and Tennessee (43–13 in Memphis). He placed fourth in the Heisman Trophy balloting and was a two-time All SEC performer. He was named Player of the Year and Back of the Year of the SEC in 1947. He set numerous school records and still ranked 12th in 2008 in career total offense with 3,076 yards. He was ranked 12th in career passing with 2,313 yards and 26 TDs.

Conerly also played baseball at Ole Miss, where he hit .467 in 1948 and was offered a professional contract.

Professional career
Conerly was drafted in the 13th round of the 1945 NFL Draft by the Washington Redskins. He played his entire career with the New York Giants as a quarterback, where he was a two-time Pro Bowl selection in 1950 and 1956 and was NFL's Most Valuable Player in 1959 by the Newspaper Enterprise Association.  Conerly was named NFL "Rookie of the Year" in 1948, a season when he set many Giants rookie franchise records that still stand. He led the Giants to three NFL Championship games in four seasons (1956, 1958–1959), including a 47–7 victory over the Chicago Bears in the 1956 NFL Championship Game. During his professional career, he earned the alliterative nickname "Chucking Charlie Conerly".

The Hit

On November 20, 1960 at Yankee Stadium in The Bronx, Conerly played a small role in one of the most famed plays in NFL history, known as The Hit. In the fourth quarter of a tied game against the Philadelphia Eagles, Conerly threw a short forward pass to Giants running back Frank Gifford, who was clothes-line tackled by Eagles linebacker Chuck Bednarik. Gifford immediately fell to the ground unconscious, was removed from the field by stretcher, and was transported to a local hospital, where he was diagnosed with a severe concussion. The concussion forced Gifford into an 18-month-long retirement until he had recuperated sufficiently to later return with the Giants.

Giants franchise records
's NFL off-season, Charlie Conerly held at least 10 Giants franchise records, including:
 Most Completions (rookie season): 162 (1948)
 Most Pass Attempts (rookie season): 299 (1948)
 Most Passing Yards (rookie season): 2,175 (1948)
 Most Passing TDs (rookie season): 22 (1948)
 Most Intercepted (game): 5 (1951-10-14 CRD and 1953-12-13 DET; tied with Jeff Rutledge and Eli Manning)
 Highest Passer Rating (rookie season): 84.0 (1948)
 Most Yds/Pass Att (season): 8.79 (1959)
 Most Yds/Pass Att (playoff career): 8.53
 Most Yds/Pass Att (playoff season): 10.48 (1958)
 Most Pass Yds/Game (rookie season): 181.3 (1948)

Later life and honors
Conerly portrayed the "Marlboro Man" in commercials after playing for the Giants.  Conerly and his wife, Perian (author of the book, Backseat Quarterback) retired to his hometown of Clarksdale, Mississippi, where he spent his final days. Conerly owned shoe stores throughout the Mississippi Delta. On December 13, 1959, Perian appeared on an episode of What's My Line?. Her line was she wrote a football column for newspapers.

Conerly was inducted into the Mississippi Sports Hall of Fame in 1966 and the Ole Miss Athletic Hall of Fame in 1987. He is also a member of the Ole Miss Team of the Century (1893–1992). Conerly is the namesake of the football award, the Conerly Trophy, given annually to the top college player in the State of Mississippi. The Professional Football Researchers Association named Conerly to the PRFA Hall of Very Good Class of 2006.
He is a seven-time Pro Football Hall of Fame finalist, but has yet to be elected as a member of the Hall.

Illness and death
Conerly underwent triple-bypass heart surgery on September 19, 1995, his birthday. He died on February 13, 1996, of heart failure following a long illness, his wife told The New York Times. He was also survived by his sisters, Ruth Meredith and Ray Steele.

See also

 List of NCAA major college football yearly passing leaders
 History of the New York Giants (1925–78)
 Ole Miss Rebels

References

Sources
 The Best Game Ever: Giants vs. Colts, 1958, and the Birth of the Modern NFL (2008)

External links
 
 

1921 births
1996 deaths
All-American college football players
American football halfbacks
American football quarterbacks
United States Marine Corps personnel of World War II
College Football Hall of Fame inductees
Eastern Conference Pro Bowl players
New York Giants players
Ole Miss Rebels baseball players
Ole Miss Rebels football players
National Football League players with retired numbers
Players of American football from Mississippi
Sportspeople from Clarksdale, Mississippi
United States Marines